This list documents major earthquakes affecting Portugal.

See also 
 List of earthquakes in the Azores

References 

Earthquakes in Portugal
Portugal
Earthquakes